Narciso Irureta Aburto (30 June 1924 − 26 December 2005) was a Chilean politician of Basque descent.

References

External links
 BCN Profile

1924 births
2005 deaths
People from Valdivia
Chilean people of Basque descent
Chilean Roman Catholics
National Falange politicians
Christian Democratic Party (Chile) politicians
Deputies of the XLV Legislative Period of the National Congress of Chile
Senators of the XLVI Legislative Period of the National Congress of Chile
Senators of the XLVII Legislative Period of the National Congress of Chile
University of Chile alumni